Richard Pither (born 23 February 1954) is a New Zealand cricketer. He played in eight first-class and five List A matches for Wellington from 1976 and 1985.

See also
 List of Wellington representative cricketers

References

External links
 

1954 births
Living people
New Zealand cricketers
Wellington cricketers
Cricketers from Christchurch